Association football is the most popular sport in nearly every European country, and UEFA is one of the six confederations of world football's governing body FIFA. UEFA contains 55 national association members, some of which are partially or entirely located in Asia. A total of 33 of the current members of UEFA have competed at the men's FIFA World Cup, while the defunct East Germany qualified once.

European nations have won the FIFA World Cup a record 12 times.

Overview

Bold indicates year(s) of best finish

Results

Most finishes in the top four

Team results by tournament

The team ranking in each tournament is according to FIFA. The rankings, apart from the top four positions (top two in 1930), are not a result of direct competition between the teams; instead, teams eliminated in the same round are ranked by their full results in the tournament.

For each tournament, the number of teams in each finals tournament (in brackets) are shown.

Legend

Tournament standings

 Quarter-finals = knockout round of 8: 1934–1938, 1954–1970, and 1986–present; second group stage, top 8: 1974–1978 
 Second round = second group stage, top 12: 1982; knockout round of 16: 1986–present

Overall team records
As per statistical convention in football, matches decided in extra time are counted as wins and losses, while matches decided by penalty shoot-outs are counted as draws. 3 points per win, 1 point per draw and 0 points per loss.

 Breakdown of successor team records

Appearances

Ranking of teams by number of appearances

Team debuts

*This total number of UEFA teams which have participated in the World Cups through 2018 is 34, using FIFA's view on successor teams (e.g., Russia is a successor of USSR and not a separate team, whereas Ukraine is a newer separate entity).
#Israel represented AFC in the 1970 tournament.

Not qualified
22 of the 55 active FIFA and UEFA members have never qualified for the final tournament.

Legend

Footnotes

Notes

See also
2006 FIFA World Cup full team ranking
Strongest football nations by Elo Ratings
FIFA World Cup records and statistics

Association football in Europe
FIFA World Cup records and statistics